Ninth (stylized as NINTH in Japan) is the ninth studio album by Japanese visual kei rock band the GazettE, released on June 13, 2018 in the US and Japan by Sony Music Records and in the UK, Europe and Russia by JPU Records.  When the album was released as a download, Ninth topped the iTunes rock charts in Belarus, Finland, France, Hungary, Poland, Turkey and  Sweden, and reached top ten in Bulgaria, Germany, Italy, Netherlands, Portugal, Russia, Slovakia and Spain. The band also charted the Billboard world chart for the first time, with the album placing 7th in its first week.

The JPU Records release includes lyric translations into English as well as Romaji.

Track listing

Limited Edition A

Limited Edition B

Regular Edition

References

External links
 PS Company Official Website
 Sony Music Entertainment Japan Official Website

The Gazette (band) albums
2018 albums